Oscar Thiffault (1912–1998) was a folk musician from Quebec, Canada.

Early life
Thiffault was originally from Estrie, and lived for most of his life in Saint-Étienne-des-Grès.

Career
Working on construction sites, Thiffault composed new versions of Quebecois folk songs, and also wrote many songs setting new lyrics to traditional melodies. He first found success in 1954 with "Le Rapide-Blanc", a humorous song written in 1935 while working on the Rapide-Blanc Generating Station. The song was a country and western adaptation of the traditional song  "Le moine tremblant et la dame".

Thiffault wrote songs honouring local sports figures, including hockey players Maurice Richard, ("Le Rocket Richard"), and Guy Lafleur ("La Tourne à Ti-Guy Lafleur").  Other songs that he wrote were "Je parle à la française" and "En écoutant Y mouillera pu pantoute".

In 1988, a documentary film about Thiffault's life, created by Serge Giguère, was released. His songs continue to be played and recorded in Quebec; the band Carotté included "“Tape la bizoune" on their debut album.

References

External links
 
 Oscar Thiffault at WorldCat

1912 births
1998 deaths
20th-century Canadian composers
Canadian male composers
Canadian folk musicians
20th-century Canadian male musicians